Micrelus is a genus of beetles belonging to the family Curculionidae.

The species of this genus are found in Europe, Africa, Japan.

Species:
 Micrelus alluaudi Hustache, 1916 
 Micrelus arabicus Colonnelli, 1984

References

Curculionidae
Curculionidae genera